Khyad hamlet is in Badami taluk in Bagalkot Landship in North Karnataka, well-known for olden structures, found many fossils of olden Stone Eld.

In 1873 Robert Bruise (learned man) found out this area. From Deccan College Pune many learned men, olden time researchers and students took up study and found information about olden time. In company with Archaeological Survey of India (ASI) - Mysore division digging department, the studying students from Delhi found several stone weapons.

The Landship administration is committed to safeguard the inheritance spot.

See also
Sidlaphadi
Hirebenkal
Sanganakallu
Anegundi
Kupgal petroglyphs
Prehistoric rock art
South Asian Stone Age
Sonda
Byse

References

Archaeological sites in Karnataka
Prehistoric art
Rock shelters
Neolithic
Burial monuments and structures
Prehistoric India
Archaeology of death
Rock art in India
Prehistoric art in India